Rootless Cosmopolitans is the debut solo album by American guitarist Marc Ribot, released by Antilles in 1990.

Background
From 1979 Ribot was gaining recognition as a  sideman working with pick-up bands for R&B artists like Brother Jack McDuff, Wilson Pickett, Carla and Rufus Thomas and even Chuck Berry. In 1984 he became a member of John Lurie's Lounge Lizards and shortly after contributed strongly to Tom Waits's Rain Dogs (1985). Ribot worked with Waits on subsequent albums and tours and contributed to recordings by Elvis Costello and The Jazz Passengers and John Zorn before recording his first album.

Recording
The album was recorded in New York City at Sound on Sound Recording except "I Should Care", which was recorded at Harold Desau, and "While My Guitar Gently Weeps", recorded by Ribot on a cassette-tape Port-A-Studio. Ribot stated "Rootless Cosmopolitans was the first record I had real control over. It’s a walking tour through all these different styles that had meant something to me emotionally as a side musician".

Reception

Reception was mixed. In The Village Voice, Gary Giddins called it "a notable record" observing "his key associates are Don Byron and Anthony Coleman and the repertory covers Hendrix and George Harrison as well as two songs – "I Should Care" and "Mood Indigo" – that are known not least for brooding interpretations by Monk. Rootless Cosmopolitans offers mostly originals that shriek and rumble and clatter with unexpected amiability, but in the pause-and-conquer strategy of those two songs, especially the 77-second "i Should Care", Ribot suggested a new potential in his playing".

The Allmusic review by Brian Olewnick awarded the album 3 stars, stating, "There is a decent amount of enjoyable music here, but it's hit and miss, very much a grab-bag affair. All of the musicians involved went on to do finer work later in their careers, though, so what value Rootless Cosmopolitans retains tends toward the historical".

Critic Robert Christgau identified Ribot's version of "While My Guitar Gently Weeps" as A Choice Cut - a good song on an album that isn't worth your time or money.

Elsewhere's Graham Reid noted "None of the interpretations will appeal to jazz or rock listeners at a guess. They are sometimes disturbingly aggressive decon/reconstructions of the source material, their version of "Mood Indigo" the most respectful . . . for a while. ... Perhaps that's why you're better to undertake this post-modern stuff without reference to the titles and just listen to the wit, ingenuity and challenge the album offers".

The Penguin Guide to Jazz commented that "much of the record is given over to pseudo-rock productions that wouldn't pass as demos in Chartsville".

Track listing

 Track 12 does not appear on the original LP.

Personnel
 Marc Ribot – guitars, harmonica, vocal
 Curtis Fowlkes (5, 10) – trombone
 Roy Nathanson (5, 8, 10, 12) – saxophone
 Don Byron (2, 4, 6, 7, 10, 11, 12) – bass clarinet, clarinet, turkey calls
 Anthony Coleman (2, 3, 4, 7, 10, 11, 12) – keyboards, piano, organ, sampler
 Arto Lindsay (3, 8) – guitar
 David Sardi (10) – guitar
 Brad Jones (4, 5, 7, 8, 10, 11, 12) – bass, guitar on (11)
 Melvin Gibbs (2, 3, 6) – bass, guitar
 Richie Schwarz (2, 3, 4, 5, 7, 8, 10, 11, 12) – drums, sampled percussion
 Michael Blair (3, 5) – drums, backwards vocal
 Ralph Carney (3) – sona

References 

1990 debut albums
Marc Ribot albums
Island Records albums
Antilles Records albums
Albums by American artists